Barrister Babu is an Indian Hindi-language social issue family drama that premiered on 11 February 2020 on Colors TV and ended on 12 November 2021. It was produced by Shashi Sumeet Productions. It starred Pravisht Mishra, Anchal Sahu and Aurra Bhatnagar Badoni. The second season, Durga Aur Charu, premiered on 12 December 2022 on Colors TV, and streams digitally on Voot. Produced by Shashi Sumeet Productions, the series starred Aurra Bhatnagar Badoni and Vaishnavi Prajapati formerly. Currently, it stars Rachi Sharma, Adrija Roy and Kunal Jaisingh.

Series overview

Plot

Barrister Babu
Set in the pre-independence era in rural Bengal, Aniruddh Roy Choudhary, a 22-year-old barrister, returns from London to Tulsipur, a village where his family practices zamindari, to eliminate customs and societal beliefs which prevent the progress of women. He is set to marry his childhood sweetheart, Saudamini Bhaumik. Meanwhile, Bondita Das is an 11-year-old (about to turn 12) Bengali Hindu girl, who lives with her widowed mother Sumati, maternal uncle Sundaram, aunt Devoleena, and cousin Sampoorna. While Sampoorna was getting married to Aniruddh's best-friend Saurabh, Sundaram and Devoleena decided to have Bondita marry an elderly man, to get money for Sampoorna's dowries. On wedding day, Aniruddh come across Bondita's child marriage, with a groom around the age of her grandfather, and revolts against it. He even seeks help from the authorities to stop the unfair marriage but faces resistance. However, the marriage never took place, as the elderly man suddenly dies midway through rituals. But the man's relatives and other attendees consider the marriage to be properly completed and hence, declares Bondita to be the widow, and sets her to become a part of Sati. Aniruddh pledges to save Bondita to Sumati. When all his other attempts to do so are in vain, he marries her as a last resort, which saves her life. Confused himself, Aniruddh brings Bondita to his home, where his family is shocked to find him married. Soon, Saudamini also learn about the marriage and eventually, plots to separate Aniruddh and Bondita. Aniruddh's father, Binoy, who wanted Aniruddh to settle in London and practice profession there, supports Saudamini in her evil attempts, believing she can make his dream come true if Aniruddh marries her. Aniruddh sees Bondita as his responsibility rather than wife.

After initial confusion, Aniruddh's uncle, Trilochan, who has very high regards for traditions and rituals, accepts Bondita, to save their family reputations and starts to prepare her as Roy Choudharys' daughter-in-law. Bondita's first problem in her new in-laws' home was due to her drenching bed at night, which was caused by traumatization after she saw her father die from snakebite before her eyes. With Aniruddh's help, Bondita overcomes this problem. She eventually impresses Trilochan, and he becomes fond of her.

A con man named Brijwasi Babu, pretending to be Lord Krishna devotee, arrives in Tulsipur. After overhearing a conversation between Bondita and Sampoorna, he traps Bondita into aiding him in his scheme to deceit people and take money from them. As the fraud runs away, Bondita is exposed as his accomplice. Aniruddh thinks Bondita did this intentionally and sends her back to her mother, where people mistreat her and even tries to kill her as she is perceived ominous for being left by her husband. Soon Devoleena sells Bondita to a brothel in Calcutta owned by a woman named Tara Bai. Aniruddh learns about Bondita's mistreatments and rushes to bring her back but is too late as she has already been taken to the brothel. Aniruddh manages to track her to Calcutta into Tara Bai's brothel and attempts to rescue her, only to get beaten up by Tara Bai's men and stabbed by Tara Bai herself. Saurabh saves dying Aniruddh in time. Aniruddh returns to the brothel with Saurabh, disguised this time, and rescues Bondita and all the other girls of the brothel.

Meanwhile, Trilochan discovers Saudamini's evil plots. To save herself from being exposed, she pushes him, resulting in his paralysis due to head injuries. After Aniruddh and Bondita returns home, Aniruddh also discovers Saudamini's plans and exposes her. She is expelled from Roy Choudhary mansion, while Bondita cures Trilochan and is finally embraced by everyone in Roy Choudhary family.

Aniruddh decides to admit Bondita to school but required permission from the chief of village as there were no girls' school in the village. Aniruddh goes to seek permission from him, a British officer, Sir John Greenwood, along with Binoy and Trilochan who also come to apply for a factory and to inform that farmers of the village do not want to cultivate indigoes. They are all surprised to see Saudamini as Sir Greenwood's newly wedded wife with a new identity of "Betty" and realises that she has smartly tricked her husband to be impressed with her, marry her and hate the Roy Choudharys, to avenge her insults and expulsion from their house. Sir Greenwood insults them in front of his guests, and eventually challenges Aniruddh to a competition, with conditions that if he loses, he'd permit Bondita to go to school and resign from his position, so they can build their factory and the farmers do not have to cultivate indigoes anymore, but if Aniruddh lost, he must relinquish his Barrister degree and his family and become Greenwood's slave for the rest of his life. Aniruddh accepts the challenge and recruits the girls he rescued from the brothel for his team, while Greenwood recruits some of the most talented and intelligent boys in the arena. Aniruddh prepares the girls himself and they manage to win the competition, overcoming many traps set by Saudamini.

After his defeat, Sir Greenwood leaves Tulsipur forever. When Saudamini wanted to accompany him, he insults her and verbally declares separation with her. Seeking revenge, she kidnaps and locks Bondita in a chemical factory. After Aniruddh's attempt to save her goes in vain, Saurabh successfully saves her, but dies himself during the attempt. Aniruddh gets Saudamini arrested on charges of murder and attempted murder. Blaming Aniruddh for the death of his son, Saurabh's father Premlal, who worked for Trilochan, attempts to murder him, by setting up a little girl to pretend to be Aniruddh's late mother Shubhra's reincarnation. However, Bondita realises and exposes his plot in time, and Premlal is also sent to prison.

Meanwhile, Devoleena and Sundaram cleverly traps and insists Binoy to marry widowed Sampoorna. After marriage, Sampoorna eventually turns against Bondita and starts creating problem in her life, including once taking advantage of her menarche.

Soon, Bondita becomes more focused on being a good wife and spending less time in her studies, which Aniruddh strongly disapproves. At same time he meets a revolutionary named Manorama, who asks Aniruddh his hand for a fake marriage of convenience to assist in her patriotic mission. Aniruddh, first declines, but later accepts her proposal, thinking this would also help him refocus Bondita in her studies. While Aniruddh's plan proves to be success, Manorama soon sacrifices her life in a revolutionary operation. She leaves behind a letter for Bondita, causing her to change her perception about Manorama.

Shortly afterwards, Aniruddh and Bondita nullify their marriage to support the Child Marriage Restraint Act. The villagers get angry at Bondita's acts and they set a handsome price for killing her. Realising Bondita's life is in danger in Tulsipur, Aniruddh sends her to a hostel in Siliguri to remain safe and educate. However, with Sampoorna and Devoleena's help, one villager is able to reach her in Siliguri and kidnap her. As Aniruddh rescues her before she gets killed, Bondita's paternal grandaunt, Kalindi Das aka Thaku Maa, enters the drama and takes Bondita to Krishna Nagar, a village where she has a great influence. She starts creating havoc in the lives of Aniruddh and Bondita. Later it is revealed that she was once set to marry Trilochan, but then one day before marriage she took care of a sick Trilochan, ignoring that this was considered against the rituals, following which Trilochan refuses to marry her and resulting in her remaining unmarried for the rest of her life, so she hates the Roy Choudharys. She arranges Bondita's marriage to Chandrachur Banerjee, but a disguised Aniruddh rescues her in time. Bondita decides to become a barrister, and Aniruddh sends her to London to fulfil her dream. Kalindi places Bondita's paternal cousin, Tupur in her place to marry Chandrachur, to save her reputations. Chandrachur, who is infatuated to Bondita, unwillingly marries Tupur after being insisted by his parents who became attracted to Kalindi's promised dowries.

8 years later
Bondita is now grown up and returns to India after becoming barrister. She first goes to meet Aniruddh in Tulsipur, where by now people have forgotten about her and hence the killing warrant issued on her has also been practically dismissed. Much to her dismay, she learns about the factionalism between Tulsipur and Krishna Nagar, as Kalindi and the Roy Choudharys have now become sworn enemies. Aniruddh refuses to see Bondita, as she is related to Krishna Nagar, but misses her. After failing to meet Aniruddh, she comes back to Krishna Nagar, where Tupur tells Bondita that after she left, when Kalindi had finally agreed to start a new friendly relation with Roy Choudharys, Aniruddh betrayed them by setting up a bomb behind gifts. Bondita refuses to believe it and goes to Tulsipur disguised as Vaijayanti to find the truth. She is shocked to find a mentally disabled Binoy. Sampoorna reveals to her that people of Krishna Nagar gave them poisoned food and later attacked them, which resulted in Binoy becoming mentally unstable. Still confused, Bondita manages to eventually change Aniruddh's rude behavior. In a turn of events, she is exposed and held responsible for another attack on Roy Choudharys, which was actually planned by Chandrachur. As Aniruddh keeps quiet and doesn't support her, she breaks all relations with him. Aniruddh, who feels guilty, realises that he has fallen in love with Bondita and confesses his feelings to her. Bondita forgives him and they manage to convince their families to end their feud. Their marriage is fixed, and they get married.

On their Kaal Raatri, Chandrachur, who had been obsessed to Bondita all along, decides to molest her. But then, he finds Bondita's paternal cousin, Tapur, trying to reveal his intentions, so molests her to shut her mouth. Aniruddh catches him red-handed and accidentally pushes Chandrachur off a cliff in a twist of events. Aniruddh accepts the crime of killing Chandrachur to save Tapur's dignity. Bondita fights for Aniruddh's case. After much investigation, she finds out the truth and encourages Tapur to testify in court, but she is humiliated by public prosecutor Subodh Chatterjee, causing her to flee without testifying. Bondita later finds Tupur's activities suspicious and finds that Chandrachur is still alive. She ties him up, and attempts to take him to the court, but he manages to escape before she reaches there. He later insists Bondita to come with him to Dacca, but unknowing to him, she stages a fake Dacca and thereby, makes him confess to all his crimes, including that he was the one who hid bombs behind Aniruddh's gifts and poisoned their food, to avenge his not being able to marry Bondita. Chandrachur gets arrested for 10 years following his confessions, Bondita wins the case, proving Aniruddh to be innocent, and becomes an inspiration to all the women. Aniruddh and Bondita finally consummate their marriage.

Shortly thereafter, Bondita is asked to fight a case for a pregnant widowed women against her in-laws'. Bondita takes the case, and presents a speech, encouraging widow remarriage. Meanwhile, Aniruddh's youngest brother, Batuk, who was sent to Italy to avoid the feud between Tulsipur and Krishna Nagar, returns after his graduation as an advocate. He has grown to be Aniruddh's lookalike and hates Bondita as he holds her responsible for his separation from his family. The attendees at Bondita's speech starts revolting, and among them Bondita notices her client being dragged by her in-laws'. She chases after them to rescue her. In a turn of events, Bondita is dragged and thrown in the river by them, in the middle of a storm. Aniruddh reaches there in time and manages to save Bondita, but he himself goes missing and is presumed dead. Batuk, who was also present there at the time and saw the entire incident happening, tries to save Aniruddh but in vain. This fuels his anger on Bondita and he tries to kill her but stops when she is revealed to be pregnant. Batuk disguises himself as Aniruddh to snatch Bondita's child and expel her from their house, after her delivery. Trilochan, who is unaware of Batuk's intentions, allows him to pretend to be Aniruddh, as he doesn't want Bondita's health to deteriorate from shock.

Day by day, Bondita becomes more suspicious of the fake Aniruddh, while the real one is shown to be alive, but paralyzed and unable to remember his address, being taken care of by a man who found him.

6 months later
Bondita continues to fight the pregnant widow's case and wins. She eventually realises that the person living with her is actually Batuk, and Aniruddh, her husband, is presumed dead by everyone. However, she believes Aniruddh is still alive, and decides to go finding him, but is compelled to stop as she goes into labor. Bondita gives birth to twins: both girls. Meanwhile, Aniruddh recovers and finally remembers his address and decides to return to Tulsipur. Batuk abducts the twins from the hospital and decides to take them to Italy. Bondita is upset by her children's disappearance and rushes back home, only to find the door locked by Batuk, who is inside preparing to depart for Italy with the twins. He also had other family members locked up in a room inside the house, as Bondita begs him to return her the twins from outside. Batuk throws lighted matchstick from above the balcony, attempting to burn Bondita alive, but Aniruddh reaches there in the nick of time and saves her. She reveals everything that had happened in the past eight months when he was not with her. A furious Aniruddh breaks the door and enters the house. After an emotional reunion with his family members, Aniruddh slaps Batuk and expels him from their house. Aniruddh and Bondita take their twins in front of Durga's idol and declare that their children will also overcome the evil practices of society and become barristers like them.

Durga Aur Charu
The show starts in the year 1942, with Anirudh-Bondita going out with their kids Durga and Devi in a car to Darjeeling to celebrate their kids 5th birthday. They are very happy that 5 years passed and their daughters have grown up into loving and caring sisters. Durga asks Devi to promise her that she would never leave her, to which they both promise that they would be together for ever. They were happily going ahead, when a truck comes and they meet with an accident, which marks the end of the story of two loving-caring Barristers. Durga falls down to the side of a bush and Devi is still in the car, having got hurt on head because of the terrible accident due to which she looses her memory. The truck drives rushes to the accident spot wherein he sees that both Anirudh-Bondita have died leaving their daughter on the back who was hurt. He sees a note written there as it was her Birthday. The man accuses himself of doing such a thing and takes Devi in his arms and leaves leaving behind the blacked out Durga in the bush.

5 years later
Durga terrifically wakes up as she sees a nightmare of the accident that took place 5 years prior. That day was Anirudh-Bondita's shanti puja. Durga gets so frightened because of the dream that she locks herself in a cupboard. In the morning Sampoorna goes to check where Durga is and is shocked to see Durga in the cupboard. Durga's fear increases more and more because of Sumona and her husband Polash. They swear to take the full Roy Chaudhary haveli's property under their name. Many incidents take place where Durga gets mocked up and even bullied but she never stood against them. Meanwhile, Devi aka Charu has been a family circus worker who would stand on the ropes without any fear, would even cross impossible tacs too. Her life's major problem was created by her adopted parents Banke and Bholi. She had love for one and only thing that was to get a proper education, with a well settled life and become a Barrister. She used to secretly study in all students school outside the class. She calls Bholi as "Neem ki Goli" as she was always after money and her greed always bethrothed her. But as predicted with bad times, always comes the good times they had one connection or one god gift that when one would suffer any pain, the other would feel the same. Durga fires her hand with the capur burnt in her hands in order to meet Devi with the grace of Goddess Durga because of which Charu feels the same. Charu refuses to withstand the oppression of the British because of which she gets hurt, wherein in Kolkata Durga feels the sharp pain too when she gets locked up by bullies when she complained against them.

Binoy decides to treat Durga in a better hospital in Delhi which angers Sumona who taunts Durga for every single penny that was wasted on her. Durga and Charu see each other and Durga gains some strength and she gets very excited and anxious to meet Charu. Charu tries to run away from Bholi as she was tired of her nagging and her greed to become rich. But she is caught and sold in a Kotha "Brothel",however she runs away with Chumki and with the help of Durga she gets rescued. Then she comes to Kolkata wherein she fights away Durga's bullies and soon finds a shelter through Durga's help. Together Durga and Charu perform Anirudh-Bondita's Shradh Pooja in order to generate peace to them. Charu soon learns that Durga is afraid and scared of Kalnemi "Polash's disguise" which she soon figures out with valid evidences. Polash denies by blaming i on somebody else. He also tries to manipulate Sampurna but is unsuccessful in it. With Charu's intense knowledge both Sampurna and Binoy are enthalped. They decide to adopt Charu that suddenly after nowhere Bholi returns as she had been blackmailed by Sheru that if she doesn't return Charu and Chumki to him he would drag her in their place. Bholi soon captivates the heart of the Roy Chaudhary's by telling fake stories and by which, Banke takes a loan from Binoy. Banke on Durga Pooja sees that a portrait had been slighted down, when he assenbles it back, he is taken aback as it was the portrait of Anirudh-Bondita. He soon realises everything and about to tell Binoy-Sampurna that Bholi learns the shocking truth and then orders Sheru to kill Banke. Charu is heartbroken by the death of her father, Bholi introduces Chumki as Devi and admits that Charu killed Banke. Chumki on the orders of Bholi tells everyone that Durga had slapped and hit her because she hated her which causes hatred for Durga in Binoy and Sampurna. Charu is dragged away by the police and taken to prison. With the grace of Durga maa and Durga, Charu is saved.

Charu puts on a disguise as Chaturvuj in order to be safe from Bholi and the police. Bholi starts having suspicions on Durga and Chaturvuj but it is soon cleared when Charu helps Bholi when she gives fake coins in order to get money which was supposed to be given to the poor, but with the help of Charu and Durga it doesn't happen and Durga gets praised by Binoy. Charu blackmails Bholi which in turn traps her only. Bholi is delighted, Banke saves Charu, Charu is happy to see Banke but he looses his memory. Together Durga and Charu make a plan and successfully their plan works. The real Chaturvuj comes which creates a fuss again. Bholi learns Durga and Charu's intensions and cunningly after a lot of problems Charu is arrested. Durga promises to Sampurna by taking an oath on the name of Binoy to never meet Charu again. Bholi and Chumki are perturbed. It is decided that Durga will study in Darjeeling to stop her from meeting Charu. Charu assumes Durga is behind it and is shattered.

10 years later
Durga and Charu both grow up to become barristers like their parents Anirudh and Bondita. But the major difference is that Durga again got all the preveliges and Charu didn't. Charu now thinks Durga as her biggest rival as because of Durga, Charu had to face 12 years of imprisonment. But she doesn't know that it was Durga who sent all her pocket money for Charu's better education. Charu gets an opportunity to get released 2 years prior her punishment. Only she had to fight a case and win in it. The policeman praises Charu for her kind and honest behaviour and also warns her to fight the case efficiently for the bail. Durga returns from Darjeeling back to Tulsipur, but she waits up for a shock when she sees the background and condition of the Haveli, Bholi still lives there with Chumki on her side as Devi. Durga when enquires about Sumona and Polash, she is dumbstruck to hear that they had left because they were caught stealing, which was all setup by Bholi. Bholi tries to instigate into Durga by telling her that she was now capable of getting married. Durga panics and says that she wants to fight cases as she was a Barrister. Sampurna agrees but keeps a condition that if she looses the case, she would have to marry the person she and Bholi would decide.

Episodes

Durga Aur Charu

Cast

Barrister Babu

Main 
Pravisht Mishra as 
Barrister Aniruddh Roy Choudhary – Shubhra and Binoy's eldest son; Sampoorna's step-son; Somnath and Batuk's brother; Shashwati's half-brother; Bondita's husband; Durga and Devi's father. (2020–21)
Advocate Batuk Roy Choudhary – Shubhra and Binoy's youngest son; Aniruddh and Somnath's brother; Shashwati's half-brother; Malika's ex-boyfriend. (2021)
 Meet Rohra / Vaidik Poriya / Daksh Rana as Child Batuk Roy Choudhary. (2020–21)
Anchal Sahu as Barrister Bondita Das Roy Choudhary – Sumati and Arvind's daughter; Sampoorna, Tupur and Tapur's cousin; Aniruddh's wife; Durga and Devi's mother. (2021)
 Aurra Bhatnagar Badoni as Child Bondita Das Roy Choudhary (2020–21)

Recurring 
Rishi Khurana as Trilochan Roy Choudhary – Patriarch of Roy Chowdhury family; Binoy's brother; Aniruddh, Somnath, Batuk and Shashwati's uncle; Kalindi's ex-fiancée. (2020–21)
Chandan K Anand as Binoy Roy Choudhary – Trilochan's brother; Shubhra's widower; Sampoorna's second husband; Aniruddh, Somnath, Batuk and Shashwati's father; Durga and Devi's grandfather. (2020–21)
Ansh Gupta as Dr. Somnath Roy Choudhary – Shubhra and Binoy's second son; Sampoorna's step-son; Aniruddh and Batuk's brother; Shashwati's half-brother. (2021)
Viraj Kapoor / Param Mehta as Teenage Somnath Roy Choudhary.(2020–21)
Pranali Rathod as Saudamini "Mini/Betty" Bhaumik Greenwood – Shivanand's daughter; Aniruddh's ex-fiancée; John's wife. (2020)
Pallavi Mukherjee as Sampoorna Jadhav Roy Choudhary – Devoleena and Sundaram's daughter; Bondita's cousin; Saurabh's widow; Binoy's second wife;Shashwati's mother; Anirudh, Somnath and Batuk's step-mother;Durga and Devi's aunt/grandmother. (2020–21)
Arina Dey as Sumati Jadhav Das – Sundaram's sister; Arvind's widow; Bondita's mother; Sampoorna's aunt. (2020–21)
Jason Shah as Sir John Greenwood – Saudamini's husband. (2020)
Rohan Roy as Sundaram Jadhav – Sumati's brother; Devoleena's husband; Sampoorna's father; Bondita's uncle. (2020–21)
Barsha Chatterjee as Devoleena Jadhav – Sundaram's wife; Sampoornaa's mother, Bondita's aunt. (2020–21)
Dev Aaditya as Saurabh Munshi – Biraj and Premlal's son; Surmani's step son; Sampoorna's late husband; Aniruddh's best friend. (dead) (2020)
Sadiya Siddiqui as Kalindi "Thaku Maa" Das – Trilochan's ex-fiancée; Arvind and Shaumik's aunt; Bondita, Tupur and Tapur's grandaunt. (2021)
Bhavya Sachdeva as Chandrachur Banerjee – Bondita's obsessive lover; Tupur's husband; Aniruddh's rival. (2021)
Diksha Tiwari as Tupur Das Banerjee – Rimjhim and Shaumik's elder daughter; Tapur's sister; Bondita's cousin; Chandrachur's wife. (2021)
Geet Jain as Child Tupur Das Banerjee. (2021)
Ketaki Kulkarni / Saumya Shetye as Tapur Das – Rimjhim and Shaumik's younger daughter; Tupur's sister; Bondita's cousin. (2021) 
Nabiya Ansari as Child Tapur Das. (2021)
Krisha Pandirkar as Shashwati Roy Choudhary – Sampoorna and Binoy's daughter; Aniruddh, Somnath and Batuk's half-sister. (2021)
Khushboo Kamal as Rimjhim Das – Shaumik's wife; Tupur and Tapur's mother; Bondita's aunt. (Dead) (2021)
Luv K Kwatra as Shaumik Das – Arvind's brother; Rimjhim's husband; Tupur and Tapur's father; Bondita's uncle. (Dead) (2021)
Aashish Kaul as Shivanand Bhaumik – Basuri's son; Binoy's friend; Saudamini's father. (2020)
Akshita Arora as Basuri Devi Bhaumik – Shivanand's mother; Saudamini's grandmother. (2020)
Premchand Singh as Premlal Munshi – Surmani and Biraj's husband; Saurabh's father. (2020)
Madhushee Sharma as Surmani Munshi – Premlal's first wife; Saurabh's step-mother . (2020)
Hetal Yadav as Biraj Munshi – Premlal's second wife; Saurabh's mother. (2020)
Adish Vaidya as Brijwasi Babu – A fraud who pretends to be a huge devotee of Lord Krishna. (2020)
Kundan Kumar as Bihari Babu – Househelper at Roy Chowdhury household. (2020–21)
Kalyani Jha as Bihari's wife; househelp at Roy Chowdhury's house. (2021)
Naman Arora as Praveen – Chandrachur's friend. (2021)
Sayantani Ghosh as Rasiya Bai – Dancer at brothel.(Dead) (2020)
Alka Kaushal as Tara Bai – Brothel owner.(Dead) (2020)
Ram Awana as Muchhad Babu – The man who sells Bondita to Tara Bai. (2020)
Prakriti Nautiyal as Ramaiya – Suraiya's twin-sister; dancer at brothel. (2020)
Pragya Nautiyal as Suraiya – Ramaiya's twin-sister; dancer at brothel. (2020)
Disha Tewani as Shubhra Roy Choudhary – Binoy's first wife; Aniruddh, Somnath and Batuk's mother; Durga and Devi's grandmother. (Dead) (2020)
Chahat Tewani as fake Shubhra Roy Choudhary – An orphan; Premlal's aide; Shubhra's imposter. (2020)
Rachana Mistry as Manorama – A revolutionary; Aniruddh's fake wife. (2021)
Simmi Ghoshal as Laboni – Chandrachur's cousin. (2021)
Chetan Pandit as Public Prosecutor Subodh Chatterjee. (2021)
Sejal Banodha as Mallika – Batuk's ex-girlfriend. (2021)

Durga Aur Charu

Main 
 Rachi Sharma as Barrister Durga Roy Choudhary – Bondita and Anirudh's elder daughter; Devi's twin sister (2023–present)
 Aurra Bhatnagar Badoni as Child Durga Roy Choudhary (2022–23)
 Adrija Roy as Barrister Devi "Charu" Roy Choudhary Bannerjee – Bondita and Anirudh's younger daughter; Bankey and Bholi's adoptive daughter; Durga's twin sister; Chumki's adoptive sister; Anirban's wife(2023–present)
 Vaishnavi Prajapati as Child Devi Roy Choudhary (2022–23)

Recurring 
Mohit Kumar (replaced by Kunal Jaisingh) as Anirban Banerjee – Abhiroop's elder son; Mihir's brother; Latika's step son (2023– present)
Chandan K Anand as Binoy Roy Choudhary – Trilochan's brother; Shubhra's widower; Sampoorna's second husband; Aniruddh, Somnath, Batuk and Shashwati's father; Durga and Devi's grandfather (2022–present)
Pravisht Mishra as Barrister Anirudh Roy Chaudhary – Bondita's husband; Durga and Devi's father (dead)(2022)
Anchal Sahu as Barrister Bondita Roy Chaudhary – Anirudh's wife; Durga and Devi's mother (dead)(2022)
Jyoti Mukherjee as Sampoorna Jadhav Roy Chaudhary – Sundaram and Devoleena's daughter; Bondita's cousin; Saurabh's widow; Binoy's second wife; Sumona's mother; Durga and Devi's aunt/step-grandmother (2022–present)
Kaushiki Rathore as Sumona Roy Chaudhary (Shashwati name turned to Sumona) – Binoy and Sampoorna's daughter; Aniruddh, Somnath and Batuk's half-sister; Durga and Devi's cousin/aunt; Polash's wife (2022–present)
Sayantan Banerjee as Polash – Sumona's husband (2022–present)
 Sudeep Sarangi as Bankey – Devi's adoptive father, Bholi's husband; Chumki's father (2022–2023)
 Preeti Amin as Bholi aka Neem ki Goli – Devi's adoptive mother; Bankey's wife; Chumki's mother (2022–2023)
 Srushti Tare as Chumki – Bankey and Bholi's daughter; Devi's adoptive sister, Fake Devi Roy Choudhary (2023–present)
Ayesha Vindhara as Child Chumki (2022–2023)
 Harsh Vashisht as Abhiroop Banerjee – Anirban and Mihir's father; A famous politician of Calcutta; Latika's husband (2023–present)
 Dolly Minhas as Mrs. Banerjee - Abhiroop's mother; Anirban and Mihir's grandmother (2023–present)
 Monica Khanna as Latika Abhiroop Banerjee - Abhiroop's second wife; Anirban's step mother (2023–present)
 Preeti Puri as Savitri Banerjee – Abhiroop's sister-in-law; Anirban's aunt (2023–present)
 Jignesh Joshi as Mr. Banerjee - Abhiroop's brother; Anirban's uncle (2023–present)
 Unknown as Sitara Bai – Tara Bai's daughter; Anirudh and Bondita's rival
 Unknown as Munna – Durga's fiancée; Bholi's worker

Production

Development

Barrister Babu
The production and airing of the show were halted indefinitely since 19 March 2020, due to the COVID-19 pandemic in India. The filming was expected to resume on 1 April 2020 but could not and the series was last broadcast on 31 March 2020 when the remaining episodes were aired. The episodes resumed on 6 July 2020.

The show went off-air on 12 November 2021 with Balika Vadhu 2 replacing it from 15 November 2021.

Durga Aur Charu
The production brought up another season titled Durga Aur Charu which premiered on 12 December 2022 moving the show Sherdil Shergill to the next time slot.

Soundtrack
The original soundtrack was composed by Shreya Phukan and Mukund Suryavansh, namely, Rishta Tera Mera (The Relation between You and Me). The themes of respective characters were composed by Ashish Rego.

Release

Barrister Babu
The first promotional teaser was released on 13 January 2020 with Pravisht Mishra and Aurra Bhatnagar Badoni as the leads of the show. On 22 June 2021, Colors TV unveiled a teaser to introduce the new actress, Anchal Sahu as grown-up Bondita, and the eight-year-leap after Anirudh and Bondita's separation. On 8 October 2021, it was announced and confirmed that Pravisht Mishra will portray dual roles of Anirudh Roy Choudhary and Batuk Roy Choudhary respectively.

Durga Aur Charu
For the second season Durga Aur Charus first promotional teaser was released on 13 November 2022 with Aurra Bhatnagar Badoni and Vaishnavi Prajapati as the leads of the show.

On 31 January 2023, Colors TV unveiled a teaser to introduce the new actors, Rachi Sharma and Adrija Roy as grown-up Durga and Charu, and the ten-year-leap after Durga and Charu's separation with a new male lead Mohit Kumar.

On 13 February 2023, Colors TV unveiled a teaser to introduce the new time slot and a new male lead Kunal Jaisingh replacing the former Mohit Kumar

References

External links

2020 Indian television series debuts
Hindi-language television shows
Indian drama television series
Indian television soap operas
Colors TV original programming
Shashi Sumeet Productions series
Television episodes about child marriage